Jena glass (German: Jenaer Glas) is a shock- and heat-resistant glass used in scientific and technological applications, especially in chemistry.

The glass was invented by Otto Schott in 1884 in Jena, Germany, where he had established  Schott AG with Ernst Abbe and Carl Zeiss. Jena glass is a borosilicate which, in early manufacture, contained added aluminum, magnesium, sodium, and zinc. It was a predecessor to other borosilicate glasses which came into wide use in the twentieth century, such as Pyrex.

References

Glass types
German inventions